Rosanna Martin (born 27 July 1973) is an Italian runner who specialized in cross-country running.

Biography

Achievements

References

External links

1973 births
Living people
Italian female cross country runners
Italian female long-distance runners
Sportspeople from the Province of Padua